Humphrey Minchin (1727–1796) was a British politician who sat in the House of Commons between 1778 and 1796.
 
Minchin was the eldest son of Paul Minchin of Ballinakill, King's County and his wife Henrietta Bunbury, daughter of Joseph Bunbury of Johnstown, county Carlow.  He entered Trinity College, Dublin on 11 January 1742, aged 14. He married  Clarinda Cuppidge, daughter of George Cuppidge of Dublin on 4 August 1750.

In 1774 Minchin canvassed Wootton Bassett but withdrew without becoming a candidate. He was elected Member of Parliament for Okehampton at a by-election on 11 June 1778  on the interest of John Spencer, 1st Earl Spencer. He was re-elected after a contest in 1780. In 1783 from April to December he was Clerk of the Ordnance. He was nominated again by the Spencer family at Okehampton in the 1784 general election. Although he was defeated, he petitioned and was seated on 27 April 1785.  Spencer intended giving up his interest at Okehampton at the next election and made this clear to Minchin in the autumn of 1787 allowing him to keep the seat until the dissolution.

At the  1790 general election Minchin was returned for Bossiney, a seat that its patron Lord Mount Edgcumbe put at the disposal of government supporters. Minchin had given his support to Pitt and in return constantly bothered him throughout the Parliament for an Irish peerage, which never materialized.

Minchin died very suddenly on 26 March 1796 from a fit while hanging up his hat before dinner.

References

1727 births
1796 deaths
British MPs 1774–1780
British MPs 1780–1784
British MPs 1784–1790
British MPs 1790–1796
Members of the Parliament of Great Britain for Okehampton